Love leadership is a philosophy of leadership based on Biblical agape (love), as described in 1 Corinthians 13. The primary tenet expects that leaders should love those they  serve as leader. Love leaders work toward ideal relationships in which leaders and followers exhibit Biblical love for one another.

Love leaders maintain a foundation of  character and of integrity. They build relationships based on  trust. One can define trust as a willingness to accept the judgment and decisions of another person. Trust cannot be maintained in a relationship that lacks integrity.

The Holy Spirit leads love leaders themselves. Often some time in prayer and meditation will develop creative solutions to the complex problems that characterize the leadership of people. The Holy Spirit will guide leaders not only to do and say the right thing, but to do it in the right time. Romans 8:14 speaks of leading by the Holy Spirit: "For all who are led by the Spirit of God are sons of God."

Love leaders operate in three realms: prophet, priest, and king:

 The prophet is the visionary, the creative one, the strategist.
 The priest is concerned with relationships and the development of people.
 The king is the ruler, the administrator.

This Biblical concept of Love Leadership is developed in The Emergence of Love Leadership: A Working Model.

The love leader develops continually in the art of leadership. No matter how masterful a leader becomes, there is always an opportunity to improve. Love leadership benefits the leader, the individual followers, and the organization.

In 2003, Canadian consultant and founder of Thinc. Corporate Change Architect, Gregg Cochlan started a research project focused on Love Leadership principles.  He later authored and published a popular book on this topic titled Love Leadership: What the World Needs Now (2008, New Voices Press, United States). The book remains popular in Canada, China, and many other places around the world.  Gregg Cochlan works primarily as an affiliate of The Pacific Institute-world leaders in applied cognitive psychology consulting and education.

References 

Leadership